The hundred of Coleridge  was the name of one of thirty-two ancient administrative units of Devon, England.

The parishes in the hundred were:
Ashprington,
Blackawton,
Buckland-Tout-Saints,
Charleton,
Chivelstone,
Cornworthy,
Dartmouth St Petrox,
Dartmouth St Saviour,
Dartmouth Townstall,
Dittisham,
Dodbrooke,
East Portlemouth,
Halwell,
Harberton,
Sherford,
Slapton,
South Pool,
Stoke Fleming,
Stokenham, and
Totnes.

See also 
 List of hundreds of England and Wales - Devon

References 

Hundreds of Devon